Inverell Airport  is an airport located approximately  south of Inverell, New South Wales, Australia.

Airlines and destinations

See also
List of airports in New South Wales

References

Airports in New South Wales